Simon Adingra (born 1 January 2002) is an Ivorian professional footballer who plays as a winger for Belgian Pro League club Union SG, on loan from  club Brighton & Hove Albion, and the Ivory Coast national team.

Club career
A former player of Right to Dream Academy, Adingra joined Danish club Nordsjælland in January 2020. He made his professional debut on 18 April 2021 in a 2–2 league draw against Copenhagen. He replaced Ivan Mesík at the 68th minute of the game and went on to score his team's second goal.

On 24 June 2022, Adingra transferred to Premier League club Brighton & Hove Albion, signing a four-year contract. Ten days later, Adingra joined Brighton's Belgian feeder club Union SG on loan for the 2022–23 season.

International career 
In March 2023, Adingra received his first call-up to the Ivory Coast senior national team for two Africa Cup of Nations qualification matches against Comoros.

Career statistics

References

External links
 

2002 births
Living people
Association football forwards
Ivorian footballers
Right to Dream Academy players
FC Nordsjælland players
Royale Union Saint-Gilloise players
Danish Superliga players
Belgian Pro League players
Ivorian expatriate footballers
Ivorian expatriate sportspeople in Denmark
Expatriate men's footballers in Denmark
Ivorian expatriate sportspeople in Belgium
Expatriate footballers in Belgium